Vaccinium scoparium is a species of huckleberry known by the common names grouse whortleberry, grouseberry, and littleleaf huckleberry.

It is native to western North America, primarily in the Rockies, Cascades, and Black Hills from British Columbia and Alberta south to far northern California to Colorado and New Mexico, and east to South Dakota. It grows in mountain habitat such as forests, meadows, and talus, occurring in subalpine and alpine climates at elevations of 700 to 3000 meters (2,333 - 10,000 feet. It is a common understory plant in many forested regions of the Rocky Mountains, being common to abundant in some areas.

Description
Vaccinium scoparium is a squat, bushy rhizomatous shrub growing not more than half a meter (20 inches) in maximum height. It is matted and clumpy, and it spreads outward with the stems rooting at nodes where it comes in contact with moist substrate. The branches are broomlike when leaflike and new green twigs have sharp angles. The deciduous leaves are alternately arranged, the serrated oval leaf blades up to 1.5 centimeters (0.6 inches) in length.

Solitary flowers occur in the leaf axils. Each is about 4 millimeters (0.16 inches) long, urn-shaped, and pink.

The fruit is a soft, bright red berry up to 6 millimeters in width. It has a tart flavor.

Uses

Wildlife
This shrub provides food for many large mammal species, such as elk, mule deer, and bears, and many smaller animals, such as squirrels, foxes, skunks, and a variety of birds.

Culinary
The berries are edible and were used for food by many Native American groups, including the Kootenay, Okanogan, and Shuswap. They are small and difficult to collect in large quantities, and Native people likely used combs made of wood or fishbones to harvest them.

References

External links

Jepson Manual Treatment: Vaccinium scoparium
United States Department of Agriculture Plants Profile — Vaccinium scoparium
Washington Burke Museum, University of Washington
Vaccinium scoparium — Calphotos Photo gallery, University of California

scoparium
Berries
Flora of the Western United States
Flora of Western Canada
Plants described in 1834
Plants used in Native American cuisine
Flora without expected TNC conservation status